Bader is a German occupational surname derived from the German word "Bad" meaning "bath". It originally referred to the owners or attendants of bathhouses, who subsequently took on other tasks including cutting hair and dentistry.

List of people with surname Bader
 ((Romeo Bader) (born 1942 Chilean Drumer,key board player,composser rock and ballad.
 Alfred Bader (1924–2018), Canadian industrialist and art collector
 Ali Bader (born 1970), Iraqi novelist
 Art Bader (1886–1957), Major League Baseball player
 Beth Bader (born 1973), American professional golfer
 Clarisse Bader (1840–1902), French writer
 Curt Bader (born 1961), American sprint canoer
 David A. Bader (born 1969), American professor of computing
 David M. Bader, American Jewish writer
 Dewan Bader (born 1971), a retired U.S. soccer player
 Diedrich Bader (born 1966), American actor
 Douglas Bader (1910–1982), British fighter pilot and amputee
 Édouard Bader (1899–1983), French rugby union player
 Ernest Bader (1890–1982), English Quaker businessman and philanthropist
 Ernst Bader (1914–1999), German actor, composer and songwriter
 Ferdinand Bader (born 1981), German ski jumper
 Gretta Bader (1931–2014), American sculptor
 Harrison Bader (born 1994), American baseball player
 Jeffrey A. Bader (born 1945), United States Ambassador
 Jesse Moren Bader (1886–1963), U.S. evangelist and Christian leader
 Kristina Bader (born 1981), a Soviet-born German bobsledder
 Lore Bader (1888–1973), American pitcher
 Marina Rice Bader, Canadian-American writer, director, and film producer
 Martin Bader (born 1985), Austrian ski mountaineer
 Márton Báder (born 1980), Hungarian professional basketball player
 Menachem Bader (1895–1985), Labor Zionist
 Pascal Bader (born 1982), Swiss footballer
 Paul Bader (1883–1971), General der Artillerie in the Wehrmacht
 Pepi Bader (1941–2021), German bobsledder
 Richard F. W. Bader (1931–2012), Canadian chemist
 Roland Bader (born 1938), German choral conductor and music director
 Ryan Bader (born 1983), American mixed martial arts fighter
 Ruth Bader Ginsburg (1933–2020), United States Supreme Court Justice
 Travis Bader (born 1991), American basketball player
 William B. Bader (1931–2016), United States politician
 Yaarub Bader (born 1959) minister of transport of Syria
 Yohanan Bader (1901–1994), Revisionist Zionist leader and Israeli politician

Given name
 Bader Al-Mutwa, Kuwaiti football player

See also
 Baade (surname)
 Baader
 Badr (disambiguation)

Surnames
German-language surnames